Full House is a Philippine television drama romantic comedy series broadcast by GMA Network. The series is based on a manhwa series of the same title by Won Soo-yeon. Directed by Mark A. Reyes, it stars Richard Gutierrez and Heart Evangelista. It premiered on November 30, 2009 on the network's Telebabad line up replacing Rosalinda. The series concluded on February 26, 2010 with a total of 65 episodes. It was replaced by Diva in its timeslot.

Cast and characters

Lead cast
Richard Gutierrez as Justin Lazatin
Heart Evangelista as Maria Jesusa "Jessie" Asuncion-Lazatin

Supporting cast
Isabel Oli as Elaine Villavicencio
Patrick Garcia as Luigi Mondragon
Pilita Corrales as Anita Lazatin
Ronaldo Valdez as Lorenzo Lazatin
Raquel Villavicencio as Liling Lazatin
Sheena Halili as Lisette Montemayor - Asuncion
Rainier Castillo as Donald Asuncion
Keempee de Leon as Mr. H
Epi Quizon as Jerry
John Lapus as Chicky
Marky Lopez as Marlon
Chariz Solomon as Maya

Ratings
According to AGB Nielsen Philippines' Mega Manila household television ratings, the pilot episode of Full House earned a 24.5% rating. While the final episode scored a 29.8% rating.

References

External links
 

2009 Philippine television series debuts
2010 Philippine television series endings
Filipino-language television shows
GMA Network drama series
Philippine romantic comedy television series
Philippine television series based on South Korean television series
Television shows filmed in the Czech Republic
Television shows filmed in the Philippines